Rui António da Cruz Ferreira (born 22 March 1960), known as Nascimento, is a Portuguese retired footballer who played as a central midfielder, and a current manager.

Club career
Born in Leiria, Nascimento made his professional debuts with local União Desportiva in 1979, after playing his youth football and starting his senior career in France. He consolidated himself as a Primeira Liga player in the following seven seasons, playing with Vitória de Setúbal (three years) and Vitória de Guimarães (four), always as first-choice and scoring nearly 30 overall goals.

At the age of 29, Nascimento signed with FC Porto, winning the only title of his career, the national championship, but he only collected 13 appearances in a total of 542 minutes. He closed out his career at 33, after spells with lowly F.C. Tirsense (two years, one of those in the top flight) and Amora FC.

Nascimento started his managerial career in the early 2000s, and would work mainly as an assistant, always under Manuel Cajuda. His first head coach experience arrived in 2006, with C.D. Pinhalnovense in the third level.

International career
Nascimento represented Portugal at the 1979 FIFA World Youth Championship, helping his team to the quarter-finals. He went on to earn five caps for the senior side in 1987, after the vast majority of the players defected following the Saltillo Affair at the 1986 FIFA World Cup.

References

External links

1960 births
Living people
People from Leiria
Portuguese footballers
Association football midfielders
Primeira Liga players
Liga Portugal 2 players
U.D. Leiria players
Vitória F.C. players
Vitória S.C. players
FC Porto players
F.C. Tirsense players
Amora F.C. players
Portugal youth international footballers
Portugal under-21 international footballers
Portugal international footballers
Portuguese expatriate footballers
Expatriate footballers in France
Portuguese expatriate sportspeople in France
Portuguese football managers
C.D. Pinhalnovense managers
S.C. Covilhã managers
U.D. Leiria managers
Sportspeople from Leiria District